Anjra (Berber: ⴰⵏⵊⵔⴰ) is a town and rural commune in Fahs-Anjra Province of the Tanger-Tetouan-Al Hoceima region of Morocco. It is the capital of the prefecture which was created by Royal decree in 2003. At the time of the 2004 census, the commune had a total population of 15,035 people living in 2,681 households.

References

Populated places in Fahs-Anjra Province
Rural communes of Tanger-Tetouan-Al Hoceima
Provincial capitals in Morocco